Eucalyptus denticulata, commonly known as the Errinundra shining gum or shining gum, is a species of tree endemic to south-eastern Australia. It has mostly smooth, white bark, lance-shaped to curved adult leaves with toothed edges, flower buds in groups of seven, white flowers and cup-shaped, barrel-shaped or cylindrical fruits. It is similar to E. nitens and was previously included in that species.

Description 
Eucalyptus denticulata is a tree that typically grows to a height of  but does not form a lignotuber. It has smooth, white, cream-coloured, green or brownish bark with rough, fibrous-flaky bark near the base. Ribbons of shed bark often hang in the upper branches. Young plants and coppice regrowth have stems that are square in cross-section with wings on the corners. The edges of the leaves are irregularly toothed and are glandular.

Taxonomy and naming
Eucalyptus denticulata was first formally described in 1991 by Ian Cook and Pauline Ladiges from a specimen collected in the Errinundra National Park by Kevin Thiele and Suzanne Prober. The description was published in Australian Systematic Botany. The specific epithet (denticulata) is a Latin word meaning "with small teeth" referring to the edges of the leaves. The uneven leaf margins may be a defence against herbivores.

Previously this species was considered an informal variant of E. nitens.

Distribution and habitat
Errinundra shing gum grows in wet forests and the margins of rainforest in Victoria and New South Wales. In Victoria it occurs on the ranges of East Gippsland including the Errinundra Plateau and Mount Kaye and in New South Wales, south from Bombala.

References

denticulata
Myrtales of Australia
Flora of New South Wales
Flora of Victoria (Australia)
Trees of Australia
Trees of mild maritime climate